α-Tocopheryl palmitate is the palmitate ester of α-tocopherol and is a form of vitamin E. Related compounds include α-tocopheryl acetate and α-tocopheryl succinate.

See also 
 Progesterone/hydroxyprogesterone heptanoate/α-tocopherol palmitate

References 

Abandoned drugs
Palmitate esters
Vitamin E